The 1975 Winter Universiade, the VIII Winter Universiade, took place in Livigno, Italy.

The competition was held as, and also known as, the World University Ski Championships, as the games included only two events (alpine and Nordic skiing).

Medal table

Alpine Skiing
Men: Slalom 
Gold – Philip Hardy (France) 
Silver – Fausto Radici (Italy) 
Bronze – Bruno Confortola (Italy)

Men: Giant Slalom 
Gold – Fausto Radici (Italy) 
Silver – Bruno Confortola (Italy) 
Bronze – Jean-Pierre Puthod (France)

Men: Downhill 
Gold – Bruno Confortola (Italy) 
Silver – Werner Margreiter (Austria) 
Bronze – Renato Antonioli (Italy)

Men: Combined 
Combined event is the overall standings of all disciplines on the Universiade program. 
Gold – Bruno Confortola (Italy) 
Silver – Philip Hardy (France) 
Bronze – Herbert Marxer (Liechtenstein)

Women: Slalom 
Gold – Aleftina Askarova (Soviet Union) 
Silver – Brigitte Jeandel (France) 
Bronze – Patrizia Ravelli (Italy) 
Bronze – Carmen Rosoleni (Italy)

Women: Giant Slalom 
Gold – Fabienne Jourdain (France) 
Silver – Patrizia Ravelli (Italy) 
Bronze – Zusana Sosvaldová (Czechoslovakia)

Women: Downhill 
Gold – Irene Böhm (Switzerland) 
Silver – Brigitte Jeandel (France) 
Bronze – Carmen Rosoleni (Italy)

Women: Combined 
Combined event is the overall standings of all disciplines on the Universiade program. 
Gold – Irene Böhm (Switzerland) 
Silver – Brigitte Jeandel (France) 
Bronze – Carmen Rosoleni (Italy)

Nordic Skiing
Men: 15 km 
Gold – Yuriy Vahruzhev (Soviet Union) 
Silver – Valeriy Isayev (Soviet Union) 
Bronze – Yevgeniy Belyayev (Soviet Union)

Men: 30 km 
Gold – Valeriy Isayev (Soviet Union) 
Silver – Yuriy Vahruzhev (Soviet Union) 
Bronze – Nikolay Gorshkov (Soviet Union)

Men: 4 x 10 km Relay 
Gold – Soviet Union 
Silver – Czechoslovakia 
Bronze – Poland

Women: 10 km 
Gold – Blanca Paulu (Czechoslovakia) 
Silver – Natalya Kruglikova (Soviet Union) 
Bronze – Nuranya Latfulina (Soviet Union)

Women: 3 x 5 km Relay 
Gold – Soviet Union 
Silver – Czechoslovakia 
Bronze – Poland

References

1975
U
U
U
Multi-sport events in Italy
Sport in Lombardy
Winter Universiade
Winter sports competitions in Italy